Stephen, Steven or Steve Murphy may refer to:

Artists, entertainers, journalists
Stephen Murphy (comics), American comic book writer
Stephen Murphy (lutemaker) (born 1942), lute maker located in Southern France
Stephen Kennedy Murphy, stage director
Steve Murphy (news anchor) (born 1960), Canadian television personality
Steven Murphy (born 1959), English actor better known as Steve Evets

Organizational leaders
Stephen Murphy, director of the British Board of Film Classification (1971–1975)
Steve Murphy (trade unionist) (born 1961), English trade union leader
 Steven Murphy (born 1954), American publishing and business executive 
Steven A. Murphy, Canadian academic administrator

Politicians and government workers
Stephen J. Murphy, member of the Boston City Council
Stephen Murphy III (born 1962), American judge
Steve Murphy (politician) (born 1957), American politician from Minnesota
Stephen Murphy (civil servant) (born 1957), DEA agent portrayed by Boyd Holbrook in the Netflix series Narcos

Sportspeople
Stephen Murphy (dual player) (born 1986), Irish hurler and Gaelic footballer
Stephen Murphy (footballer) (born 1978), Irish footballer
Stephen Murphy (hurler) (born 1996), Irish hurler
Stephen Murphy (ice hockey) (born 1981), Scottish ice hockey goaltender
Stephen Murphy (snooker player), Irish snooker player

Fiction
Steven Murphy, a character in the crime TV series Narcos